Francis Bernard Courtney (13 July 1906 − 28 August 1944) was a Canadian rower. He competed in the men's coxless four event at the 1932 Summer Olympics. He was killed in action during World War II.

Personal life
Courtney served as a major in the South Saskatchewan Regiment during the Second World War. He was killed on 28 August 1944 whilst fighting in the Basse-Normandie region of France. Courtney is buried at Bretteville-sur-Laize Canadian War Cemetery.

References

External links

1906 births
1944 deaths
Military personnel from Reading, Berkshire
Canadian male rowers
Olympic rowers of Canada
Rowers at the 1932 Summer Olympics
Sportspeople from Reading, Berkshire
Canadian military personnel killed in World War II
Canadian Army personnel of World War II
South Saskatchewan Regiment officers